Lakefield is an unincorporated community located in the  Town of Grafton in Ozaukee County, Wisconsin, United States. Lakefield is located at the intersection of County T (Lakefield Road) and County W (Port Washington Road).

History
Lakefield took its name from the nearby lake and fields.

The Lakefield area was once home to several octagonal barns built by Ernst Clausing, an immigrant from Saxony.  Clausing built them in the 1890s.

References

Unincorporated communities in Ozaukee County, Wisconsin
Unincorporated communities in Wisconsin